Headquartered in Indianapolis, Indiana, the Crossroads of America Council ( #160) serves Scouts and Scouters in Central Indiana.  It was initially formed when Central Indiana Council, Delaware County Council, Kikthawenund Council, and Whitewater Valley Council merged in 1972.  Recently, in the past decade, Wabash Valley and Crossroads of America were merged to form the new Crossroads of America Council, serving 25 counties in Indiana, extending from the Illinois state line to the Ohio state line.  As of the end of 2012, the council served more than 36,000 youth thanks to more than 9,000 volunteer leaders.

History
The council maintains Scout offices in Indianapolis, Muncie, and Terre Haute.

The Crossroads of America Council has also served as home of the Crossroads of America Scout Band.  Founded in 1917 by "Chief" F.O. Belzer as a camp band, this band has grown into a concert band that has traveled throughout the United States, Canada and England representing the Boy Scouts of America and the Crossroads of America Council for 102 years.  The Bands annual summer tour takes it to as many scout camps as it can for the enjoyment of those scouts at camp.}

Districts
 Bear Creek District, serving Fayette, Franklin, Rush, Shelby, Union, Wayne and southern Randolph counties
 Monon District, serving Northwest Marion, Southern Boone, Hamilton and Tipton counties
 White River District, serving Blackford, Delaware, Randolph, Madison, and Henry counties
 Pathfinder District, serving southern Marion county and Johnson county
 Fall Creek District, serving Hancock and Southeast and Northeast Marion counties
 Five Creeks District, serving Boone, Montgomery, Clinton, Hendricks, and Western Marion counties
 Wabash Valley District, serving Vigo, Vermillion, Clay, Parke, Sullivan and Putnam Counties

Camps
The council currently operates seven camps:
 Ransburg Scout Reservation - Bloomington
 Camp Belzer- Indianapolis
 Camp Kikthawenund - Frankton
 Camp Krietenstein - Center Point

Order of the Arrow
The Crossroads of America Council is served by Jaccos Towne Lodge #21, Order of the Arrow.  It is also home to Firecrafter, a local Scouting service fraternity.  Central Indiana Council was not home to a lodge of the Order of the Arrow until the merger of the councils in 1972.

See also
 Scouting in Indiana

References

External links

Local councils of the Boy Scouts of America
Youth organizations based in Indiana